In linguistics, measure words are words (or morphemes) that are used in combination with a numeral to indicate an amount of something represented by some noun.

Description
Measure words denote a unit or measurement and are used with mass nouns (uncountable nouns), and in some cases also with count nouns. For instance, in English,  is a mass noun and thus one cannot say "three muds", but one can say "three drops of mud", "three pails of mud", etc. In these examples, drops and pails function as measure words. One can also say "three pails of shells"; in this case the measure word pails accompanies a count noun (shells).

The term measure word is also sometimes used to refer to numeral classifiers, which are used with count nouns in some languages. For instance, in English no extra word is needed when saying "three people", but in many East Asian languages a numeral classifier is added, just as a measure word is added for uncountable nouns in English. For example, to say one dog and three dogs in Chinese, one would need to say yīzhīgǒu (simplified 一只狗, traditional 一隻狗) and sānzhīgǒu (simplified 三只狗, traditional 三隻狗) respectively, which could be literally translated as one animal dog and three animal dog respectively. There are numerous Chinese measure words, and nouns differ in what measure words they can use. While many linguists maintain a distinction between measure words and numeral classifiers, the terms are sometimes used interchangeably. For instance, materials for teaching Chinese as a second language generally refer to Chinese classifiers as "measure words".

Most measure words in English correspond to units of measurement or containers, and are themselves count nouns rather than grammatical particles:
one quart of water
three cups of coffee
four kernels of corn, three ears of corn,  two bushels of corn

Though similar in construction, fractions are not measure words. For example, in "seven-eighths of an apple" the fraction acts as a noun. Compare that to "seven slices of apple" where "apple" is a mass noun and does not require the article "an". Combining the two, e.g. "seven-eighths of a slice of apple", makes it clear the fraction must be a noun referring to a part of another countable noun.

In many languages, including the East Asian languages referred to above, the analogous constructions do not include any equivalent of the English of. In German, for example, ein Glas Bier means "a glass [of] beer". This is interesting since both languages are West Germanic languages, making them closely related to each other. However, the equivalent of the English of is common in Romance languages such as Spanish, French, and Portuguese. In Spanish "a glass of beer" is "un vaso de cerveza", in French it is "un verre de bière", and in Portuguese it is "um copo de cerveja".

Classifiers versus measure words
Classifiers play a similar role to measure words, except that measure words denote a particular quantity of something (a drop, a cupful, a pint, etc.), rather than the inherent countable units associated with a count noun. Classifiers are used with count nouns; measure words can be used with mass nouns (e.g. "two pints of mud"), and can also be used when a count noun's quantity is not described in terms of its inherent countable units (e.g. "two pints of acorns").

However, the terminological distinction between classifiers and measure words is often blurred – classifiers are commonly referred to as measure words in some contexts, such as Chinese language teaching, and measure words are sometimes called mass-classifiers or similar.

See also
Collective noun
Count noun
List of collective nouns

References 

Parts of speech